The 1988–89 División de Honor de Balonmano season was the 31st since its establishment. FC Barcelona were the defending champions, having won the previous season.

League table

First  Round

Group A

Group B

Second round

Title group

Permanence group

External links
Liga ASOBAL

Liga ASOBAL seasons
handball
handball
Spain